Alastair Garth Robinson (born 5 November 1956) is a former New Zealand rugby union player. A lock, Robinson represented North Auckland at a provincial level, and was a member of the New Zealand national side, the All Blacks, on their 1983 tour of Scotland and England. He played four matches for the All Blacks but did not appear in any tests.

References
Alastair Robinson's son, Tom Robinson plays for the Blues Super Franchise and Northland

1956 births
Living people
People from Waipukurau
People educated at Christ's College, Christchurch
Lincoln University (New Zealand) alumni
New Zealand rugby union players
New Zealand international rugby union players
Northland rugby union players
Rugby union locks
Rugby union players from the Hawke's Bay Region